Juicio Final (Spanish for "Final Judgement") is the collective name of a series of semi-regularly occurring lucha libre, or professional wrestling major show promoted by Mexican professional wrestling promotion Consejo Mundial de Lucha Libre (CMLL). There has been multiple events promoted under the Juicio Final name over the years with the earliest taking place in 1955 and the most recent in 2019. The event has taken place in March, June, August or December, at times replacing the Sin Piedad event in December, and twice it has been promoted a show both as Juicio Final as well as Homenaje a Dos Leyendas: El Santo y Salvador Lutteroth

Event history
For decades Arena México, the main venue of the Mexican professional wrestling promotion Consejo Mundial de Lucha Libre (CMLL), would close down in early December and remain closed into either January or February to allow for renovations as well as letting Circo Atayde occupy the space over the holidays. As a result, CMLL usually held an "end of the year" supercard show on the first or second Friday of December in lieu of their normal Super Viernes show. 1955 was the first year where CMLL used the name "El Juicio Final" ("The Final Judgement") for their year-end supershow.

All subsequent Juicio Final shows have taken place on Friday nights and all in Arena México, CMLL's "home arena". Most have taken place in December, three, two have taken place in March and one in June. The two March Juicio Final events were also promoted under the name Homenaje a Dos Leyendas ("Homage to two legends"). The exact number of matches is unclear as only three matches for the 1991 Juicio Final show were documented and confirmed. The Mini-Estrella division has only been featured in one show while the female division  was featured on two shows.

The Juicio Final shows generally feature one or more Lucha de Apuestas, or bet matches, the most prestigious match form in lucha libre, with wrestlers fighting for either their hair or their masks. Rocky Star, All-Star, Huracán Ramírez II, Aníbal, El Supremo, Kahoz, Villano III and Averno have all lost their mask at a Juicio Final and Bestia Salvaje, Kato Kung Lee, Black Magic, El Dandy, El Satánico, Brazo de Plata, Perro Aguayo and Halloween all have been shaved bald as a result of their losses. The Luchas de Apuestas between Villano III and Atlantis was voted the 2000 Wrestling Observer Match of the Year. Juicio Final has hosted only one championship match, which saw the team of Olímpico, Safari and Mr. Niebla defeat Blue Panther, Fuerza Guerrera and El Signo to win the Mexican National Trios Championship. The 2011 Juicio Final event was the only show to host tournament matches as it featured two semi final matches in the Forjando un Ídolo trios tournament.

The first verified Juicio Final show took place in 1955, making it the third oldest regularly held professional wrestling show series, only behind the CMLL Anniversary Shows (1934), Super Viernes (1938), and the Arena Coliseo Anniversary Shows (1944).

Dates, venues, and main events

Footnotes

References